Kiss the Goat is the debut album by Swedish black metal band Lord Belial. It was released in 1995 through No Fashion Records. In April 2014, Greek label Floga Records reissued Kiss The Goat for the first time on LP. This edition is limited to 250 copies black vinyl and 250 copies dark purple with black splatter vinyl; Both colors have slightly revised cover artwork — in the originally intended dark purple rather than the production error pink on the No Fashion pressing — and the new Lord Belial band logo. Floga Records would again reissue it as part of a limited 6LP Lord Belial boxset which was released in September 2014.

Track listing 
 "Hymn of the Ancient Misanthropic Spirit of the Forest" – 5:20
 "Satan Divine" – 3:59
 "Grace of God" – 4:14
 "The Ancient Slumber" – 5:40
 "Into the Frozen Shadows" – 5:36
 "The Art of Dying" – 1:38
 "Osculum Obscenum" – 3:00
 "Mysterious Kingdom" – 6:08
 "In the Light of the Fullmoon" – 5:01
 "Lilith - Demonic Queen of the Black Light" – 4:36
 "Bleed on the Cross" – 2:59 (Bonus track on the Japanese release of the album)

Credits 
Thomas Backelin - Vocals, Guitars
Niclas Andersson - Guitars, Vocals
Anders Backelin - Bass
Micke Backelin - Drums

References

1995 debut albums
Lord Belial albums